The Adventure Zone is a weekly comedy and adventure actual play podcast based loosely upon the Dungeons & Dragons game series, along with other role-playing games. The show is distributed by the Maximum Fun network and hosted by brothers Justin, Travis, and Griffin McElroy, and their father Clint McElroy. Regular episodes of the podcast feature the family solving puzzles, fighting enemies, and leveling up their characters in a series of cinematic and humorous encounters.

History

Origins and Balance (2014–2017)
In 2010, the McElroy brothers launched their flagship podcast My Brother, My Brother and Me, an advice podcast which joined the Maximum Fun network in 2011. During the 97th episode in May 2012, the brothers answered a question about a Dungeons & Dragons game—which Justin called "The Adventure Zone".

The McElroy brothers would ultimately begin playing with their father Clint in the summer of 2014, using the newly released Starter Set for the fifth edition of D&D, which was released that July. The set came with the module The Lost Mine of Phandelver, which served as the basis for the first few sessions. The first of these recordings was initially released as an experimental MBMBaM episode entitled The Adventure Zone on August 18, 2014, to cover for Justin's paternity leave. Starting that December, The Adventure Zone was then expanded into its own podcast on the Maximum Fun network, releasing biweekly. Griffin McElroy served as the show's primary host and Dungeon Master for the show's first campaign, later titled the Balance Arc. The campaign concluded with Episode 69 in August 2017. Additionally, three special episodes were released over the course of the campaign, titled The "The Adventure Zone" Zone, and these act as "an informal chat show" discussing the game.

"Déjà Vu" by Mort Garson (from the album Ataraxia: The Unexplained) served as the primary theme song for The Adventure Zone during the Balance Arc, as well as various interstitials and backing tracks. Griffin McElroy also created original compositions to enhance the show's production. Later arcs would use original themes for opening and closing.

Experimental arcs and Amnesty (2017–2019)
Following the conclusion of the Balance campaign, the McElroys decided to work on smaller "experimental arcs", a set of shorter campaigns using other systems, in order to give themselves time to develop their next overarching storyline. Three experimental arcs were aired from October 2017 to March 2018. These included Clint's Commitment arc (played with the Fate system), Griffin's Amnesty arc, and Travis' Dust arc (both played using Powered by the Apocalypse). Each of these arcs takes place in their own game worlds separate from those explored in the other campaigns. With the conclusion of these experimental arcs, the McElroys announced that Season 2 of "The Adventure Zone" would continue the story introduced in Amnesty, and that it would become the next full campaign.

Griffin McElroy again took on the role of game master (called a "Keeper" in the system). While the arc was inspired by monster of the week shows such as Buffy the Vampire Slayer and Supernatural, Griffin stated that the arc is mostly based on the Persona game series. To replicate the less connected nature of the former's 1990s setting, Kepler is situated in West Virginia's section of the National Radio Quiet Zone. Hal Lublin provides a guest voice in two episodes. The campaign ended after 36 episodes on September 23, 2019.

When performing live, the McElroy family continued to predominantly use the Balance setting in this period, though two Amnesty live shows, The Ballad of Bigfoot and Amnesty Halloween Special,  released on October 17, 2019, and November 12, 2020, respectively. Additional episodes of The "The Adventure Zone" Zone were released at the start and conclusion of the main run of Amnesty.

Graduation (2019–2021)
All four cast members played as guests in Dimension 20’s Tiny Heist campaign, a game DMed by Brennan Lee Mulligan and released in early 2020 on the Dropout network. Travis, the Dungeon Master of the upcoming arc, was inspired by Tiny Heist'''s worldbuilding, commenting that "the world in that was so well thought through that it was basically like a big playground..." Travis' role as DM was confirmed in a SyFy Wire interview. A trailer for Graduation released on October 18 and announced a return to the Dungeons & Dragons system. The fantasy themed campaign, centered around a school for heroes and villains, ran from October 31, 2019, to April 15, 2021. The arc was poorly received, with reviewers citing Travis' lack of experience as a DM, as well as the very high number of NPCs. Travis considered stepping back from the show around the 20th episode, and having someone else brought in to finish the season, but decided that would be unfair to those who were invested, including the players.

There were few live shows during the run of Graduation due to the COVID-19 pandemic, and none of these made use of Graduation's Nua setting. A "Laughter & Love" McElroy family tour in April 2020 would have featured The Adventure Zone performances in Boston and Baltimore. Instead of Nua or another established setting, a series of new campaign settings were used in virtual live shows, sometimes with multiple episodes and continuity between performances. These minor campaigns include Fur (with Erika Ishii), Hootenanny, Inheritance, Just Us, Mercer (with Matt Mercer) and Lords of Crunch.

Ethersea and switch to seasonal format (2021–)
Before the finale of Graduation, Griffin McElroy confirmed in an interview with Brennan Lee Mulligan that the fourth season of Adventure Zone would also be played in the Dungeons & Dragons 5th edition system, and would involve ships. The campaign's name, Ethersea, and a brief trailer were released on May 3, 2021. The series is set in and around the submarine city of Founder's Wake, for which Griffin McElroy drew inspiration from a number of sources including The Eternal Darkness: A Personal History of Deep-Sea Exploration by Robert Ballard. A special primer episode was released on October 12 for the Maximum Fun Block Party, introducing new listeners to the podcast and suggesting where to begin- with Justin recommending Ethersea, Griffin recommending Balance, Clint recommending Amnesty and Travis recommending his experimental arc Dust. An Imbalance mini-series was released in November 2021 under a new moniker, The Zone of Adventure. The game featured Aabria Iyengar as DM and released on YouTube rather than through the Maximum Fun network. The series also included video of the players, rather than being recorded simply as a podcast. Ethersea continued to air alongside it during November.

There were several formatting changes brought into effect for Ethersea. Unlike previous arcs, in which world-building was undertaken privately by the GM, the world-building for Ethersea was a collaborative effort. This took the form of a five-episode prologue using the game system The Quiet Year, with the campaign proper beginning on July 8. The McElroys were able to hire Rachel Jacobs to handle post production of the series rather than editing it themselves, which made it possible for them to switch to a weekly rather than biweekly schedule.

With the pandemic still underway in the United States, the McElroys began a limited return to live shows, with performances at Emerald City Comic Con in 2021, as well as "live and virtual" remote shows. These used a variety of systems, The latter performance returning to the "Hootenanny" continuity seen in occasional live shows since 2019. This was followed by the "Fancy Takes Flight Tour" from March to July 2022, which featured several Adventure Zone performances across the United States, along with other McElroy family shows.

With the conclusion of Ethersea in August 2022, the McElroys announced that The Adventure Zone would be adopting a seasonal format- with Dust returning for a short second season later that year, a new Steeplechase campaign to follow and finally a planned second season for Ethersea in the future.

Structure
To date the podcast has had several campaigns. The nomenclature for the division of campaigns has evolved over the course of The Adventure Zones run, complicated by experimental arcs that were revisited by the family later for additional stories. Griffin McElroy jokingly commented during the experimental era "I don't even know how we're numbering these any more". This table reflects the "season" nomenclature introduced in an episode of The The Adventure Zone Zone in 2022, which distinguishes each run of a campaign, including experimental arcs, as seasons. This definition has been applied to the remainder of the table, here listed by their original debut. Several of these campaigns were preceded by special episodes for world building and character generation, which are counted in the "Setup" column. The episode counts here also do not include live shows.

Additionally, there have been several shorter campaigns. These have variously been released as bonuses to Maximum Fun donors, or as live shows which are released online later. Along with the main campaigns, each game corresponds with a letter of the alphabet (albeit performed out of alphabetical order, with some not fitting the format). Some, such as Lords of Crunch, were initially performed live, with the recording released as a donor bonus. The dates here correspond with when the recordings were released for live shows, rather than the actual performance dates.

The campaigns are set in different worlds, however some elements do cross over. The character of Indrid Cold debuted as an NPC in Amnesty, as a resident of the planet Sylvain, and was later transported to the world of Dust via unknown means that are only alluded to vaguely in the narrative. Clint McElroy occasionally portrays an incarnation of himself, a "space janitor" who cameos in the background of scenes akin to Stan Lee's many cinematic appearances. Some thematic elements are also consistent across most campaign settings, including cat-themed merchants. During the Balance campaign, fans could also suggest items to stock at "Fantasy Costco" for the characters to buy between quests. The Fantasy Costco system has been partially revived in each successive season to give fans a way to interact with the show.

Advertisements from corporate sponsors and paid messages from listeners are read by the Dungeon Master in the middle segment of the program. Fans tweeting about the show using "#thezonecast" may be selected to become the namesakes for various NPCs in the story lines; this has been a feature of the show since the original episodes of the Balance season.

Main campaigns
Balance
The overall plot of The Adventure Zone first campaign, the "Balance Arc", involves a global war catalyzed by the Grand Relics—seven powerful magical artifacts that each contain the essence of one of the schools of magic - excluding the eighth, the school of enchantment, which has no artifact assigned to it. These relics compel those who find them to use them, almost always in a chaotic and destructive manner. The relics have been erased from everyone's minds save for the Bureau of Balance, an organization that seeks to find and destroy the relics. The narrative also explores the mysteries of the Red Robes, the magical faction who purportedly created the Grand Relics, and the lost histories of the main characters that involve a shadowy, cosmic threat to the universe. The primary quests challenge the characters to retrieve one of the Grand Relics. In addition, "Lunar interlude" episodes aboard the Bureau's moon base allow the characters to regroup, purchase new equipment, and prepare for the next quest. The primary quests are:

 Here There Be Gerblins (Episodes 1–6) – The introductory quest is loosely based on the Dungeons & Dragons Starter Set adventure Lost Mine of Phandelver, but quickly diverges into the primary plot of the adventure. The party helps Merle's cousin Gundren find and reclaim his family's lost treasures, but are quickly dragged into a conspiracy involving a powerful magical weapon of mass destruction, a war no one seems to remember, and the mysterious Bureau of Balance which seeks to keep it all hidden. The plot centers on the discovery of the Phoenix-Fire Gauntlet, the Grand Relic of evocation.
 Murder on the Rockport Limited (Episodes 10–16) – The party goes to reclaim a relic found by a Bureau operative killed after placing it in an unbreachable vault on the Rockport Limited train. Finding a Rockport staff member murdered on the trip, the party must discover the murderer before the train arrives in Neverwinter. During their mission, they meet and are aided by the World's Greatest (boy) Detective, Angus McDonald. The party discovers and retrieves the Oculus, the Grand Relic of illusion.
 Petals to the Metal (Episodes 18–27) – The party is sent to retrieve the Gaia Sash, the Grand Relic of conjuration, used to control nature and weather. This relic is currently being used by a master thief known only as the Raven. Through a series of events, the party find themselves allied with Hurley, a law enforcer and former lover of the Raven, and taking part in a mostly-illegal death race to claim the relic. The plot for the quest occurred to Griffin while watching Fast Five.
 The Crystal Kingdom (Episodes 29–39) – A science-fantasy adventure quest focused on the Philosopher's Stone, the Grand Relic aligned with the school of transmutation. The Philosopher's Stone has begun transmuting a floating laboratory into pink tourmaline, with lethal consequences for the world below if it is not kept from crashing. The party must navigate the dangers of the crystallizing laboratory, track down rogue Bureau scientist Lucas, and battle with mysterious enemies including crystal golems and the undead bounty hunter, Kravitz. The plot for the quest occurred to Griffin while watching Alien.
 The Eleventh Hour (Episodes 41–49) – A quest based around a time-loop mechanic. The party is sent into the Woven Gulch to retrieve the Temporal Chalice, the Grand Relic of Divination.  Avi, friendly Bureau cannoneer, helps them enter the bubble-surrounded and wild-west inspired town, Refuge. There, the party first meets Roswell, a clay-based earth elemental with a Vermilion flycatcher acting as their voice, and find themselves cycling repeatedly through the final hour of the town's life, in a loop created by the Temporal Chalice.  
 The Suffering Game (Episodes 51–57) – A darker quest in which the party must retrieve the Necromancy Grand Relic: the Animus Bell. This relic was discovered by the Director before the Bureau was created, and in her failed attempt to retrieve it, she sacrificed twenty years of her life. Inspired by the Zero Escape video game series, the party delves into Wonderland, a lethal, mentally taxing, and endless deathtrap that promises whatever participants desire as a prize for surviving.  However, as the party travels through Wonderland, making sacrifices and fighting horrific monsters, the place is revealed to be a trap created by a pair of twin Liches who feed on suffering.
 The Stolen Century (Episodes 60–66) – A prequel quest in which the party rediscovers their long-forgotten memories and gains better insight into the Hunger, the ultimate foe of all reality.
 Story and Song (Episodes 67–69) – The climactic finale quest of the Balance Arc, in which old friends and former foes join the party to stop the Hunger from consuming the multiverse.

As the Dungeon Master, Griffin portrayed all non-player characters (except for Garyl, Taako's summoned phantasmal binicorn).

Commitment
The first experimental arc, Commitment is a superhero themed arc. The game was run by Clint McElroy using the FATE system. The characters all work for the Do Good Fellowship, a "cult adjacent" organization that uses technology and science to improve the world. This arc has a total of four episodes, not including the setup episode the McElroys used to establish their characters, etc.

Amnesty
Initially the second of the mini-arcs, Amnesty was later announced as season two's full length arc on March 29, 2018. The first five episodes, as part of the mini-arcs, began the series' temporary weekly schedule to get to a full second season more quickly. The Amnesty arc is based on the Monster of the Week system by Evil Hat Productions, and is set in the fictional ski-resort town of Kepler in contemporary West Virginia. Kepler is regularly invaded by eldritch monsters nicknamed "Abominations" from a mysterious otherworld called Sylvain, opposed by a monster-hunting organization called the Pine Guard headquartered at the titular Amnesty Lodge. Sylvain is a dying world, being consumed by an evil force known as the Quell, and the latter half of the series partly involves the cast attempting to stop it. These abominations arrive on a monthly cycle, which form the basis for a series of monster hunts by the protagonists. Like Balance, Amnesty featured lunar or "lodger" interlude episodes for downtime between hunts.

 Hunt for the Beast (Episodes 1–5) – A bear-like monster is loose on Kepler, West Virginia. Duck Newton, Aubrey Little and Ned Chicane stumble across a gateway to the alien world of Sylvain, and learn of the monthly abominations that show up in town. They join up with the Pine Guard, a group of misfits attempting to keep the peace between the two worlds by dealing with these abominations quietly. They assist Mama in taking the beast down by luring it into a cave and setting it ablaze.
 Hunt for the Water (Episodes 6–11) – With a water monster attacking the town, the Pine Guard begin their second hunt. After saving a group of elderly swimmers, the Pine Guard lure the creature to local waterpark "H2 Whoah, that was fun" to take it down. Outside of this, Ned launches a TV show named "Saturday Night Dead", and Aubrey continues to explore her magic and connection to Sylvain.Hunt for the Calamity (Episodes 13–19) – With a series of strange prophesied accidents taking place over town, the Pine Guard attempt to intervene with a pizza sign collapse and Ned is almost killed. The group meet Indrid Cold, the Mothman, who has been attempting to warn the townspeople of these accidents but is not the culprit. The Pine Guard eventually track down the anomalous giant tree that is warping reality.Hunt for the Countenance (Episodes 21–28) – A shapeshifting abomination attacks the local motorbike gang, the Hornets- and this causes the gang to learn of the gate. The secret swiftly gets out among a number of Kepler residents. After a battle in a morgue, Ned steals an art piece for a former thief colleague- only for the thief to turn out to be the shapeshifter. The shapeshifter later takes Ned's form and announces the presence of monsters and a gateway on his TV show. A final confrontation at the gateway sees Ned killed, and the destruction of much of Kepler.Finale (Episodes 30–36) – After Ned's death, Clint McElroy changes character to Arlo Thacker, previously an NPC. The Pine Guard and their allies from town infiltrate a government compound around the gate, and break through to a third location separate from either world. The Pine Guard learn that Earth and Sylvain were linked by an alien race intent on pairing aggressive civilizations up to destroy each other, in order to protect their own planet from potential future threats. The group desperately fight to save their world as well as Sylvain.

As the Keeper (GM), Griffin portrayed all non-player characters, with the exception of Agent Hanes who is portrayed by guest star Hal Lublin. The voice of Duck's talking sword Beacon is provided by Justin.

 Dust 
Initially the third experimental arc, this setting was revisited for a second season in 2022. The campaign is set in the Crescent Territory, a fantasy-western territory divided between competing families and organizations. It is inhabited by the Fleshes (humans), the Fangs (vampires), and the Furs (werewolves), and there is great tension between these groups.Season One - After the politically sensitive murder of Jeremiah Blackwell, three detectives- Augustus Parsons, Errol Ryehouse and Gandy Dancer- are hired to solve the case before dawn in an effort to prevent fighting between the families of Dry River.Season Two - Augustus Parsons teams up with fellow detectives Indrid Cold and Callan after he is hired to bring Pearl Blackwell, now the heir to the town's mining business, back from Crescent City. Pearl in turn hires them to conduct a train heist as a condition of her leaving town with them. Erika Ishii guest stars as Louise "Lulu" Kagiyama.

As the Master of Ceremonies, Travis portrayed all NPCs, save for a comedic encounter in the first season where the family portrayed a series of townspeople coming out to see why the warning bell had been rung.

 Graduation 
The players initially take on the role of students who have enrolled in the henchperson and sidekick program at Hieronymous Wiggenstaff's School for Heroism and Villainy. The campaign focuses initially on their classes and misadventures at the school, but later moves to broader themes such as Order vs. Chaos, threats of Demon wars, mind control vs. free will, and rebellion against capitalism. Unlike the other campaigns, Graduation is not formally split up into quests or other sections. Travis McElroy, as DM, portrayed all non-player characters.

 Ethersea 
The Ethersea campaign was announced on May 3, 2021 and began on May 6, 2021. The first five episodes were not played in Dungeons & Dragons, but used a world-building tabletop game called The Quiet Year. The prologue tells the story of a group of survivors with one year to find a way to transport their society underwater, as a worldwide magical storm threatens to wipe out all above-water life. The prologue does not feature consistent characters for each player, with all at the table instead making decisions for the society, developing and occasionally portraying interchangeable characters. The campaign proper began the following week, detailing the lives of a group of adventurers making their way in the new underwater city of Founder's Wake. Like Balance, the campaign is divided into a series of quests with interludes for downtime between.The Gallery Job (Episodes 1–5) – In order to succeed in a job interview, Amber, Devo and Zoox are told that they need a ship. The trio inadvertently help in the theft of one- and undertake a job attempting to loot a submerged gallery. The mission goes poorly, with an attack by pirates de-railing the operation. They do however net enough money to purchase their own ship, the Coriolis.The Infinite Clam (Episodes 7–12) – Newly hired by the Bluespan Brokerage, the trio set off in search of a missing member of the Benevolent Parish, and tumble into a clamshell of infinite capacity. They investigate a city on the interior, and hunt down the anomaly causing the spatial distortion.The Abyssal Auction (Episodes 14–19) – The group are contracted to attend an auction on behalf of Old Joshy, encountering a mysterious collection of anonymous high rollers. With only a limited pool of cash, they are forced to engage in strategies such as bid rigging to achieve their goal. Shortly afterwards, the auction descends into violence and the party flees.Cambria's Call (Episodes 22–30) - Founder's Wake is contaminated by a spore that was unwittingly carried in by the Coriolis, resulting in a second epidemic of a disease named the Sallow. With the infrastructure of the city in peril, the party attempt to restore the memory of Finneas Cawl in order to repair it and save the city. By means of a drug-fueled shared dream, the party is able to explore Cawl's memories, and head out in search of a bubble city he had found on the seafloor. They return with fresh magical phytoplankton to produce oxygen for Founder's Wake.The Menagerie (Episodes 31–36) - The party are contracted to solve a theft at a local menagerie. This takes them to the headquarters of an organization called Crescendo at the behest of Aloysius Supreme. The crew destroys this base and, unfortunately, the Dreams of Deborah, and return to Founder's Wake with the animals.Benefactor's Folly (Episodes 39–43) - The party alongside Ballaster Kodira attempt to track down and stop Benefactor Orlean. This leads them to a coral dome concealing a portal to another world.Finale (Episode 44) - A wrap-up episode covering the months after their confrontation at the coral dome.

As DM, Griffin portrayed all NPCs during the campaign proper, with the exception of a flashback sequence in episodes 26 and 27. In these episodes the NPC Finneas Cawl is taken over by Clint, with Travis and Justin portraying new characters.

 Steeplechase 
The Steeplechase campaign is set in an eponymous vast and all encompassing amusement park. It is not formally broken up into arcs denoted in the episode titles as previous campaigns were, but is naturally divided by the jobs the players are involved in. These are interspersed by formal downtime periods in which the characters can engage in their vices. The story is framed by an enigmatic character known as the Weaver.The Anniversary Pin (Episodes 1–2) - The party conduct a heist in the Prize Pantry, an attraction based around opening boxes of cereal to search for prizes. They set out to retrieve an anniversary pin at its public showcase before it is placed in the box.The Clean (Episodes 4-10) - Blackmailed by Sticky Fingers Paul Pantry, the mascot of Prize Pantry who has security footage of their previous, somewhat bungled heist, the party sets out to steal a getaway vehicle from Gutter City.Passion's Cove (Episodes 12-16) - Now pursued by robot assassins known as barristers, the party must keep moving. They are hired by Scott Boldflex, former employee of queer inclusive reality dating show Passion's Cove (a parody of Bachelor in Paradise). Boldflex has been replaced by an artificial version of himself, and hires the party to disable his hard-light replacement and steal his old guitar Sympatico. The party must compete in the show in order to reach him.Ephemera' (Episodes 17-) - Having succeeded in Passion's Cove, the party are hired by Kenchel Denton to steal the spire from Ephemera, the fantasy themed layer. Ephemera parodies various fantasy franchises including Shrek and The Adventure Zone: Balance.

As GM, Justin portrayed all NPCs during the campaign, with the exception of Krystal, a character present in the introductory vlogger segments that act as recaps for previous episodes. Krystal is portrayed by Autumn Seavey Hicks.

Secondary campaigns

(K)nights Campaign 
A campaign consisting of 3 episodes created as exclusive content for the MaxFunDrive 2017. Travis DMs the adventure, which brings together an unlikely group of heroes: Troth, a tiefling monk played by Justin; Tom Collins, a half-elf warlock bartender played by Griffin; and Lenny Manolito, a human keytar-playing bard played by Clint. This campaign uses the Dungeons & Dragons system, and features a guest appearance by Lin-Manuel Miranda, who plays the bard Atreyus.

Elementary Campaign
Elementary is a two-shot campaign created exclusively for the MaxFunDrive 2019. The episodes use a special game system Four (sometimes five) Sherlock Holmes and a Vampire (Who Is Also One of the Aforementioned Sherlock Holmes), written by Andrew Young. What little plot there is involves Justin (as GM), Travis, Griffin and Clint (and once guest Patrick Rothfuss) each playing as a different version of Sherlock Holmes solving nonsensical, convoluted mysteries.

Fur Campaign
Much like Elementary, Fur is a one off made for the MaxFunDrive 2019, the game system used is Honey Heist, a one-page RPG written by Grant Howitt, and Travis is the DM. Justin, Griffin, and Clint play three bears attempting to rob a briefcase of Manuka honey from the Sacramento Convention Center during a screening of Bee Movie.

Hootenanny Campaign
TAZ: Hootenanny was performed live in Nashville, TN at the Ryman Auditorium and is a country music themed space opera. The game used One Seven Design's system Lasers and Feelings, inspired by The Doubleclicks's album of the same name. The party consists of three musicians, all from different planets: Shoots McKrackin (Travis), Benny Gene Esserit (Clint), and Pepsi Liberty (Justin) as the band Hootie and the Nannies, who are performing at the Grand Space Opry. Griffin acted as the game master. The game ended with the four McElroys and Paul Sabourin performing a cover of Future Folk's song "Space Worms".

A sequel, "2tenanny", was released during the 2020 MaxFunDrive as exclusive bonus content for donors to the Maximum Fun network. Clint acted as game master (Benny having left the band to go solo), with Griffin playing replacement band member 48 (short for the entire lyrics to the song "I Like It, I Love It" by Tim McGraw).

Inheritance Campaign
TAZ: Inheritance was performed live at the Balboa Theatre in San Diego, CA during San Diego Comic Con 2019, based on an original system created by the players. The setting takes place in a post-apocalyptic desert wasteland, featuring groups of different stereotypical dads. The party consists of four dads, each from a specific dad tribe (Sports Dads, Vacation Dads, Car Dads, and Grill Dads). They team up to defeat the evil Crafting Dads in order to obtain the legendary TV remote control. The game featured all four McElroys as players, with CollegeHumor's Brennan Lee Mulligan, host of Dimension 20, as GM.

 Just Us 
The Just Us campaign is GMed by Travis McElroy, and described by Griffin as "Travis' take on superheroes trying to pretend to be normal". It was recorded as a live show in Atlanta using the game Supernormal, written by Ursidice.

 Mercer 
TAZ: Mercer is a one-shot made for the MaxFunDrive 2020, marketed as a "modern day crime drama" set in an unnamed north-east American city in 2006 and based on Dungeons & Dragons 5th Edition. It was named after and guest DMed by Matthew Mercer of Critical Role.

 Lords of Crunch 
Lords of Crunch was a one-shot performed at the Taft Theatre in Cincinnati, OH. It was GMed by Justin, using an original system based on One Seven Design's Lasers and Feelings system. Travis, Clint, and Griffin play as cereal-box mascots. It was released as bonus content for the 2020 MaxFunDrive.

 Charlieverse 
Charlieverse was a one-shot released for MaxFunDrive 2021, GMed by Justin and designed by his 6-year-old daughter, Charlie. It was based on the Muppet Babies RPG system by Origami Gaming, an adaption of the Lasers and Feelings system. Griffin, Clint and Travis play characters that have been transformed into babies and who have to traverse the "Fruity Pebbles Castle of Torment: A Scary Castle with One Hundred Rats" to return to their adult forms.

Characters

 Reception 

The podcast has been well-received, especially among younger and LGBT+ demographics. It has sold out dozens of live shows since 2014, and has been downloaded hundreds of millions of times. One of the creators, Justin McElroy, said of the podcast, "[it] has a following." The Adventure Zone currently holds a 4.9 rating on Podbay, and a 5.0 rating on Apple Podcasts.

The Balance arc received overwhelmingly positive criticism. It was described by The Mary Sue as "one of the most moving and epic adventures of recent memory." The climactic ending in particular was warmly received. Patrick Rothfuss stated the show possessed “some of the finest storytelling I have ever experienced. In any genre. Ever.”

The Amnesty arc was described by The Mary Sue as possessing a "uniquely compassionate kind of story-telling, based on connection and hope, and that's something so rare in this world that even the imperfect efforts must be applauded, simply because there's nothing else quite like it out there." Comic Book Resources also received the arc positively, stating that it was "filled with great characters, goofs, and heart-wrenching moments."

The Graduation arc received criticism for Travis McElroy's performance as dungeon master, with complaints that the arc had a confusing plot line, an overabundance of secondary characters, and a lack of meaningful consequences for poor dice rolls by the players. Graduation was poorly received for its heavy exposition, lack of player agency and large cast of non-player characters (NPCs). The Mary Sue commented that "Travis... went a bit too far in crafting his own narrative and didn’t let his players, well, play enough." The positive representation of Fitzroy Maplecourt as the show's first asexual character however was praised. Em Rowntree of The Geekiary was more positive about the direction of the campaign, emphasizing that "the heart of TAZ as far as I'm concerned is a sort of very stupid and unexpectedly emotional outrageousness. It soars when it's narratively unjustifiable."

Graphic novel adaptationsThe Adventure Zone: Here There Be Gerblins, a graphic novel adapting the first quest, was released in July 2018. The book was written by the McElroys, illustrated by Carey Pietsch, and published by First Second Books. It quickly topped New York Times' best-selling trade fiction list, becoming the first graphic novel to do so. A sequel, which adapts the quest Murder on the Rockport Limited, was released on July 16, 2019. The third book in the series, Petals to the Metal, was released on July 14, 2020. Crystal Kingdom, the fourth book in the series, was published July 13, 2021. The fifth book in the series, The Eleventh Hour, was published on February 21, 2023.The Adventure Zone: Here There Be Gerblins, The Adventure Zone: Murder on the Rockport Limited!, and The Adventure Zone: Petals to the Metal have all become New York Times Bestsellers.

Animated series
An animated adaptation of the Balance Arc is in development for the NBCUniversal's streaming service Peacock. It has not been picked up for a series as of January 2020. In July 2020, the McElroys revealed that they are developing the pilot and that it will be different from both the podcast and graphic novel versions and possibly feature a different voice cast.

See also
 Critical Role Fantasy podcast
 HarmonQuest''

Explanatory notes

References

External links
 

2014 podcast debuts
Actual play podcasts
American podcasts
Audio podcasts
Dungeons & Dragons actual play
Fantasy podcasts
Maximum Fun
Podcasts adapted for other media